Karachi Transport Ittehad (KTI) is coalition of owners of private buses, minibuses, taxis and rickshaws in Karachi, Sindh, Pakistan. Karachi Transport Ittehad sets the fares of private Transport in Karachi.

See also
 Transport in Karachi
 Transport in Pakistan
 Jinnah International Airport
 Auto rickshaw
 Pakistan Civil Aviation Authority
 Makran Coastal Highway
 Port of Karachi
 Port Qasim
 Karachi Cantonment Railway Station
 National Highway Authority
 Lyari Expressway
 Karachi Northern Bypass
 Super Highway

References

External links 
 Karachi Website

 Transport